The Alster Case is a lost<ref>[http://memory.loc.gov/diglib/ihas/loc.mbrs.sfdb.3394/default.html  The Library of Congress American Silent Feature Film Survival Catalog:..The Alster Case]</ref> 1915 silent film drama directed by J. Charles Haydon and starring Bryant Washburn and Ruth Stonehouse. It was based on a novel, The Alster Case'', by Rufus Gillmore. It was produced by the Essanay Company.

Plot

Cast
Bryant Washburn - George Swan
John Cossar - Trask (*aka John H. Cossar)
Ruth Stonehouse - Beatrice
Anne Leigh - May Walsh
Louise Crolius - Cornelia Alster
Betty Scott - Linda
Arthur W. Bates - Keith
Rod La Rocque - Allen Longstreet
Beatrice Styler - Agnes

References

External links

surviving image

1915 films
American silent feature films
Lost American films
Films directed by J. Charles Haydon
Essanay Studios films
American black-and-white films
Silent American drama films
1915 drama films
1915 lost films
Lost drama films
1910s American films